The Durham City congestion charge was the first congestion charge to be introduced  in the UK in October 2002.

Durham County Council introduced the toll for drivers using 1,000-year-old Saddler Street in the city centre which stands on the peninsula above the River Wear. This is the only public access road leading to the World Heritage Site of Durham Cathedral and Durham Castle. It was mainly introduced to reduce traffic flow using the road.

Prior to the introduction of the congestion charge around 3000 vehicles used the road on a daily basis. The narrow street, built centuries ago to cater for nothing bigger than a horse and cart, is used by up to 17,000 pedestrians a day, and, according to Durham County Council a  "conflict between the two was causing traffic congestion, environmental problems and road safety hazards, as well as detracting from the experience of the World Heritage Site". A year after the charge had been introduced, figures showed vehicle activity using the road fell by 85%. Until 2011, traffic was controlled by a rising bollard in the road, which was monitored by CCTV and linked to an intercom system.

It was reported in late April 2007 that since October 2002, the retractable bollard has been responsible for "300 instances of car damage". According to Durham County Council, "the vast majority are very, very minor, resulting in damage such as a bent number plate."

On 22 January 2011, The Northern Echo reported that Durham County Council was consulting on replacing the bollard with an automatic number plate recognition system. As part of works on Saddler Street in the summer of 2011 the charge was temporally suspended and a new ANPR system installed, the system was reinstated on 25 July but the Charge was not enforced until 29 August to allow for the registration of exempt vehicles.

See also
Congestion pricing
London congestion charge
Motoring taxation in the United Kingdom
Manchester congestion charge

References

External links
Durham Road User Charge Zone (congestion charge)

Durham, England
Road congestion charge schemes in the United Kingdom
Electronic toll collection